Evans Kondogbia (born 3 May 1989) is a former professional footballer who plays as a forward. Born in France, he made six appearances for the Central African Republic national team.

Career
Born in Nemours, France, Kondogbia has played club football for Lorient, Hamoir, Sprimont-Comblain, Liège, Charleroi, Racing Mechelen and Arles-Avignon.

He made his international debut for Central African Republic in 2010.

On 22 July 2015, Kondogbia signed for Italian Lega Pro club Renate.

Personal life
His younger brother Geoffrey Kondogbia is also a footballer.

References

External links
 

1989 births
Living people
People from Nemours
Citizens of the Central African Republic through descent
French sportspeople of Central African Republic descent
Central African Republic footballers
French footballers
Footballers from Seine-et-Marne
Association football forwards
Central African Republic international footballers
Challenger Pro League players
Ligue 2 players
Championnat National 3 players
Serie C players
Serie D players
Segunda División B players
FC Lorient players
RFC Liège players
R. Charleroi S.C. players
K.R.C. Mechelen players
AC Arlésien players
A.C. Renate players
FC Jumilla players
A.S.D. Città di Foligno 1928 players
U.S. 1913 Seregno Calcio players
Central African Republic expatriate footballers
Central African Republic expatriate sportspeople in Belgium
Expatriate footballers in Belgium
Central African Republic expatriate sportspeople in Italy
Expatriate footballers in Italy